Dreahook Creek is a left tributary of Holland Brook in Readington, New Jersey.  It begins on township owned land near Creek Road and Dreahook Road.  It merges with another small tributary (East Dreahook Creek) on the east side of County Route 620 before entering the Holland Brook.  It was named after the former Dutch village of Dreahook (Drea-Hook).  The name is a corruption of Driehoek (drie- three and hoek- angle), which is the Dutch word for triangle.  It was likely named for the triangle created by the settlement in its relation to the early roads to Flemington, Whitehouse Station, Readington Village and Pleasant Run, which have since been rerouted.

Crossings

Dreahook Creek
Dreahook Road
Horseshoe Road
CR 523/Main Street

East Dreahook Creek
CR 620/Dreahook Road East

See also
List of rivers of New Jersey

References

Tributaries of the Raritan River
Readington Township, New Jersey
Rivers of New Jersey
Rivers of Hunterdon County, New Jersey